The Edison Bridge (officially the Thomas Alva Edison Memorial Bridge) is a bridge on U.S. Route 9 in New Jersey, spanning the Raritan River near its mouth in Raritan Bay. The bridge, which connects Woodbridge on the north with Sayreville on the south, was opened to weekend traffic starting on October 11, 1940, and was opened permanently on November 15, 1940. As of 2003, the bridge carries more than 82,000 vehicles daily and is owned and operated by the New Jersey Department of Transportation. It also runs directly parallel to the Driscoll Bridge, which carries the Garden State Parkway.

Construction
The design of the Edison Bridge was the direct responsibility of Morris Goodkind, chief engineer of the bridge division of the New Jersey State Highway Department, a position he had held since 1925.

The bridge is named for Thomas Edison. Construction on the bridge was started on September 26, 1938. The Edison Bridge was officially dedicated on December 14, 1940, with the ribbon cut by Mrs. Mina Edison Hughes, widow of the inventor. Also participating in the ceremonies were New Jersey Governor A. Harry Moore, and then Governor-elect Charles Edison, son of the inventor, along with the bridge's designer, Morris Goodkind.

The nine spans over the river would consist of three continuous span girders of record-setting proportions. The main girder over the navigation channel would be  in length, consisting of a  span flanked by two  spans, and would set a new U.S. record for length. The two other continuous girders were each  in length, consisting of three  spans.

The final cost of the bridge was $4,696,000. Over 2,500,000 pounds (1,133.98 metric tons) of reinforcing steel and 19,000,000 pounds (8,618.26 metric tons) of structural steel were used.

Rehabilitation
As part of a $48 million construction project, a major overhaul of the aging sixty-year-old bridge was undertaken, to address issues relating to the advanced age of the structure and to bring it up to the latest highway standards. The rehabilitated northbound span of the bridge was opened on to traffic on October 21, 2003, and marked the long-awaited conversion of the old Edison Bridge from a one-span, 4-lane structure with no shoulders to a two-span bridge with a total of six lanes with shoulders.

On November 19, 2001, the southbound span was officially renamed "The Ellis S. Vieser Memorial Bridge" in a bill sponsored by Senator Joseph Kyrillos.

See also
List of bridges documented by the Historic American Engineering Record in New Jersey
List of crossings of the Raritan River

References

External links

History and Technology of the Edison and Driscoll Bridges
NJDOT press release regarding reopening of the northbound rehabilitated span

Bridges over the Raritan River
Woodbridge Township, New Jersey
U.S. Route 9
Bridges completed in 1940
Historic American Engineering Record in New Jersey
Road bridges in New Jersey
Bridges of the United States Numbered Highway System
Bridges in Middlesex County, New Jersey
Steel bridges in the United States
Girder bridges in the United States
1940 establishments in New Jersey